Kinogama station is a Via Rail flag stop station located at Kinogama in the Unorganized North Part of Sudbury District in Northeastern Ontario, Canada. It is on the Canadian Pacific Railway transcontinental main line, and is served by the regional rail Sudbury – White River train.

References

External links

Via Rail stations in Ontario
Railway stations in Sudbury District
Canadian Pacific Railway stations in Ontario